Reynolds Neck is a rural locality in the local government area (LGA) of Central Highlands in the Central LGA region of Tasmania. The 2016 census recorded a population of 7 for the state suburb of Reynolds Neck.

History 
Reynolds Neck is a confirmed locality. The name was derived from when Reynolds Island was attached to the shore of Great Lake.

Geography
The waters of Great Lake form the eastern boundary.

Road infrastructure 
Route A5 (Highland Lakes Road) runs through from north to south.

References

Towns in Tasmania
Localities of Central Highlands Council